Amirabad-e Qaleh Lan (also Romanized as Amīrābād-e Qal‘eh Lān and Amīrābād-e Qal‘ehlān; also known as Kalīlān, Qala‘lān, Qal‘ehlān, Qal‘eh-ye Lān, and Qal‘elān) is a village in Panjeh Ali-ye Jonubi Rural District, in the Central District of Qorveh County, Kurdistan Province, Iran. At the 2006 census, its population was 259, in 53 families. The village is populated by Kurds.

References 

Towns and villages in Qorveh County
Kurdish settlements in Kurdistan Province